was a Japanese samurai of the Sengoku period who served the Takeda clan. Masakazu's landholding, starting in 1563, was in the Suwa District of Shinano province. He was active under both Takeda Shingen and Shingen's son Katsuyori as a commander of infantry . He also served for a time as the warden of Takashima Castle. Masakazu was killed in 1582 while leading a counterattack against Kiso Yoshimasa, a former Takeda vassal who had turned traitor during the Tokugawa/Oda attacks on Shinano and Kai.

References

Naramoto Tatsuya (1992). Nihon no kassen: monoshiri jiten. (Tokyo: Shufu to seikatsusha).

Samurai
1582 deaths
Japanese warriors killed in battle
Takeda retainers
Year of birth unknown